The Archos PMA400 is a personal digital assistant (PDA) from Archos, with a hard disk drive and audio and video playback and recording capabilities, so it also functions as a portable media player (PMP).  The PMA400 was the most expensive within the line of products that they supplied.

Based on the Linux Qtopia Embedded operating system, the device is more like a personal digital assistant than a normal media player.  The PMA400 features the following:

 IR remote
 Software (pre-installed or from online feed)
 PIM: E-mail client, Agenda, Calendar, Contact Directory
 Text Viewer and Editor
 PDF Viewer
 Opera and Konqueror Embedded web browsers
 Podcast client
 Most Qtopia apps that work out of the box are available.
 Games using the Mophun engine

Though it remains Archos's only dedicated PDA, some of its features can be seen on the later 604WiFi including touchscreen and web browsing.

OpenPMA
The original firmware had some major bugs that are now being gradually fixed in an open source firmware by the openPMA project. Added functionality from openPMA are:

 Audio support from openPMA: Ogg vorbis, Musepack
 Many Zaurus packages are compatible or have been adapted
 Access SMB/CIFS network shares using Samba (software) and a GUI frontend
 Act as a SMB/CIFS server allowing other computers on the network to access the internal hard disk
 The MediOS extension originally developed for the AV and Gmini series is available enabling the user to run NES, Sega Mega Drive emulators and Doom interpreter.

See also
 Archos Generation 5
 List of portable media players with Wi-Fi connectivity

External links
Archos PMA430 on PointLisse.com

Personal digital assistants
Portable media players
Linux-based devices
Touchscreen portable media players
Computer-related introductions in 2005